St John's Church, Stretton is the Church of England parish church of Stretton, South Staffordshire.

History
The chancel is 12th century. The nave and transepts were rebuilt in 1860 to designs by the architect Edward Banks. The church is a Grade II* listed building.

Team ministry
The parish is part of the Penkridge Team which includes the following churches:
St James’ church, Acton Trussell
All Saints’ church, Bednall
St Lawrence's church, Coppenhall 
St Leonard's church, Dunston
St Michael's church, Penkridge
Levedale Mission, Penkridge
St Modena's church, Pillaton

See also
Grade II* listed buildings in South Staffordshire
Listed buildings in Lapley, Stretton and Wheaton Aston

References

Church of England church buildings in Staffordshire
Churches completed in 1860
Grade II* listed churches in Staffordshire